Sigara arguta is a species of water boatman in the family Corixidae. It is endemic to New Zealand.

Description 
They have a distinctive marble pattern on their wing cases and long legs which assist their movement through the water. Their abdominal hairs are able to capture small air bubbles used to keep them afloat and these can often be seen upon close observation. They swim with their "belly" facing downwards, unlike other common swimming insects. S. arguta mouth parts are covered by a beak-like triangular labium.

S. arguta use their forelegs to scoop up algae and detritus which they then eat.

Habitat 
S. arguta are found across both temporary and permanent freshwater ecosystems. They are typically found in slow-moving bodies of water, such as rivers and streams, lakes, ponds and even man-made pools such as cow troughs.

References

Insects described in 1926
Hemiptera of New Zealand
Endemic fauna of New Zealand
Sigara
Endemic insects of New Zealand